Markus Mikael Hännikäinen (born 26 March 1993) is a Finnish professional ice hockey player. Hännikäinen is currently playing with Linköping HC in the Swedish Hockey League (SHL).

Playing career
Hännikäinen recorded a break-out season with 19 goals and 27 assists for 46 points with 51 penalty minutes and a +22 plus/minus rating in 60 games with JYP Jyväskylä in the 2014–15 season. After Hännikäinen's Liiga team, JYP Jyväskylä was eliminated from the playoffs by Oulun Kärpät it was announced on 20 April 2015 that Hännikäinen had signed a two-year entry level contract with the Columbus Blue Jackets.

On 21 January 2017, during an afternoon game against the Carolina Hurricanes, Hännikäinen scored his first NHL goal. He recorded his first NHL assist on February 25, 2017, against the New York Islanders. On 21 March 2017, he signed a two-year contract extension through to 2019 with the Blue Jackets.

In his first full season with the Blue Jackets in 2018–19, Hännikäinen recorded four goals and three assists for seven points with two penalty minutes in 44 games with the Blue Jackets, setting single-season career highs in goals, points and games played.

On 18 June 2019, Hännikäinen as an impending restricted free agent agree to a one-year contract extension with the Blue Jackets. Approaching his fifth year within the Blue Jackets organization in the 2019–20 season, Hännikäinen was unable to retain his roster spot and was familiarly assigned to the Cleveland Monsters. Having made 28 appearances with the Monsters, on 24 February 2020, Hännikäinen was traded by Blue Jackets to the Arizona Coyotes in exchange for a conditional seventh-round pick in 2020. He was assigned to AHL affiliate, the Tucson Roadrunners, adding 3 goals in 7 appearances before the season was abandoned due to the COVID-19 pandemic.

As a free agent from the Coyotes, and with the following season to be affected by the ongoing pandemic, Hännikäinen opted to remain in his native Finland by returning to original club, Jokerit of the Kontinental Hockey League (KHL), on 16 December 2020.

During the 2021–22 season, Hännikäinen posted 16 points through 44 regular season games before Jokerit withdrew from the KHL due to the Russian invasion of Ukraine. As a free agent from Jokerit, Hännikäinen completed the season with Adler Mannheim of the Deutsche Eishockey Liga. 

On 28 May 2022, Hännikäinen opted to sign a one-year contract with Swedish club, Linköping HC of the SHL, for the 2022–23 season.

Career statistics

Regular season and playoffs

International

Awards and honours

References

External links

1993 births
Living people
Adler Mannheim players
Cleveland Monsters players
Columbus Blue Jackets players
Finnish expatriate ice hockey players in the United States
Finnish ice hockey left wingers
HPK players
Jokerit players
JYP Jyväskylä players
Kiekko-Vantaa players
Lake Erie Monsters players
Linköping HC players
Ice hockey people from Helsinki
Tucson Roadrunners players
Undrafted National Hockey League players